The A14 motorway, an Autobahn in central Switzerland, is a divided highway connecting the A2 with the A4, within the Canton of Lucerne.

The A14 is congruent with the National Road N14 and part of the main traffic artery between the Innerschweitz and the metropolitan area Zurich. It runs mostly along the Reuss (river), which it twice crosses. The second bridge on the Reuss is the second highest bridge in the Canton of Zug.

Notes

References

 "Die Schweitzer Autobahnen", Autobahnen.ch, 2009, web: Autobahnen.ch (with sub-webpage for A14).
 More sources in "Motorways of Switzerland".

External links
 Photo-series: A14 on Autobahnen.ch
  Port expansion project Buchrain-Rontal
 Buchrain Connection/Shuttle Rontal (Canton Lucerne)

A14